Marco Méndez (born Marco Anibal Méndez Ramírez on October 1, 1976, in Uruapan, Michoacán) is a Mexican actor.

Méndez began as a model and later studied acting in Televisa's CEA. He made his television debut as 'Oscar Méndez' in the telenovela, Las vías del amor. Subsequently, he appeared in various other telenovelas, as well as a few films. In the telenovela Muchachitas como tú, he portrayed the role of the dance instructor 'Joaquín', and in the telenovela Querida Enemiga, he played Dr. Bruno Palma.

Telenovelas 
 Me declaro culpable (I Plead Guilty) (2017–18) as Javier Dueñas Lopez
 La doble vida de Estela Carrillo (Estela Carrillo’s Double Life) (2017) as Don Asdrúbal Guerrero
 Sueño de amor (Dream of Love) (2016) as Óscar Sousa Villaurrutia
 Pasión y poder (Passion and Power) (2015-2016) as Agustín Ornelas
 Porque el amor manda (2012-2013) as Diego Armando Manriquez
Las Bandidas (Bandidas) (2013) as Alonso Cáceres
La que no podia amar (The One Who Couldn't Love) (2011) as Esteban
Triunfo del Amor (Triumph Of Love) (2010) as Fabian Duarte
Mar de amor (Curse by the Sea) (2010) as David Bermudez
Los Exitosos Perez (2009) as Diego Planes
Querida enemiga (Dear Enemy) (2008)  as Bruno Palma
Muchachitas como tú (Young Girls Like You) (2007) as Joaquín
La Verdad Oculta (The Hidden Truth) (2006) as Carlos Ávila
Contra viento y marea (Against All Odds) (2005) as Renato
Mujer de Madera (Wooden Woman) (2004) as Alberto
Amar otra vez(Loving Again) (2004) as Gonzalo
Rubí (2004) as Luis Duarte López
Las vías del amor (The Tracks of Love) (2002) as Oscar Méndez
Salomé (2001) as León

External links

1976 births
Mexican male film actors
Mexican male telenovela actors
Mexican male models
People from Uruapan
Male actors from Michoacán
Models from Michoacán
21st-century Mexican male actors
Living people